The 1995–96 Argentine Torneo Argentino A was the first season of third division professional football in Argentina. A total of 32 teams competed; the champion was promoted to Primera B Nacional.

Club information

Zone A

Zone B

Play their home games at Estadio José María Minella.

Zone C

Zone D

Teams from Argentino B that played the Third Stage

First stage

Zone A

Zone B

Zone C

Zone D

Second stage

Championship Stage

Zone A

Zone B

Relegation Stage

Zone A

Zone B

Third stage

Championship Stage

Zone A

Zone B

Relegation Stage

Championship final

|-
!colspan="5"|Promotion playoff 1

|-
|}

Extra Promotion playoffs

|-

|-
!colspan="5"|Promotion playoff 2

|-
!colspan="5"|Promotion playoff 3

|-
!colspan="5"|Extra Match

Aldosivi was promoted to 1996–97 Primera B Nacional by winning the playoff.
Gimnasia y Esgrima (CdU) was promoted to 1996–97 Primera B Nacional by winning the playoff.
Olimpo was promoted to 1996–97 Primera B Nacional by winning the playoff.

See also
1995–96 in Argentine football

References

Torneo Argentino A seasons
3